Satow may refer to:

People with the surname
 Anyone with the Japanese family name Satō who romanizes it as Satow
 Ernest Mason Satow, diplomat
 Heath Satow, sculptor
 Michael Graham Satow, Engineer noted for railway preservation in the United Kingdom and India
Bruce Satow, Computer expert

Places
Satow, Germany